Amy Arnold (born 6 October 1974) is a British author.

In 2018 her debut novel Slip of a Fish was awarded the Northern Book Prize and subsequently published by And Other Stories. In 2019, it was shortlisted for the Goldsmiths Prize.

Arnold currently resides in Cumbria in the UK.

Works 
 2018 Slip of a Fish. And Other Stories, UK.

Awards 
 (2018) Northern Book Prize

References

Living people
1974 births
British women novelists
21st-century British novelists
21st-century British women writers
People from Oxford